Deianira Listens to Fame or Deianira delivering the fatal tunic to the Fury is a 1638 oil painting on canvas (245x168 cm). It is now in the Sabauda Gallery in Turin. It is a pendant to another Rubens painting, Hercules in the Garden of the Hesperides. It shows Hercules' wife Deianira and another woman holding a tunic soaked in the blood of Nessus, which Deianira believed would make Hercules to be forever true to her but instead killed him.

External links
https://web.archive.org/web/20150924020521/http://www.galleriasabauda.beniculturali.it/catalogo/#page/826

1638 paintings
Mythological paintings by Peter Paul Rubens
Paintings in the Galleria Sabauda